The cuneiform sign za is a common use sign in the Amarna letters and the Epic of Gilgamesh. It is used syllabically for ṣa, za, and ZA (ZA as parts of personal names, places, or common words, etc.), and alphabetically for "ṣ" (s), "z", or "a". (All the 4 vowels, a, e, i, o are interchangeable.)

In the 14th century BC Amarna letters, "za" is used in the spelling of the word for "mayor" (city, city-state administrator), Akkadian hazannu. For example, in EA 144 (from Zimreddi of Sidon), obverse, line 5: "man-hazzanu", Lú-Ha-za-nu. Za has a fairly high usage in the vassal states sub-corpus of the Amarna letters.

Epic of Gilgamesh use
For the Epic of Gilgamesh, the following usage is found in Tablets I-XII: ṣa-(79 times); za-(32); ZA-(15 times).

Symbol
—Cuneiform sign ZA

 Borger (2003): 851
 Borger (1981):
 HZL: 366
 phonetic values
 Sumerian: ZA
 Akkadian: za, sà, ṣa
 Hittite:

References

Held, Schmalstieg, Gertz, 1987. Beginning Hittite. Warren H. Held, Jr, William R. Schmalstieg, Janet E. Gertz, c. 1987, Slavica Publishers, Inc. w/ Glossaries, Sign List, Indexes, etc., 218 pages.
Moran, William L. 1987, 1992. The Amarna Letters. Johns Hopkins University Press, 1987, 1992. 393 pages.(softcover)
 Parpola, 1971. The Standard Babylonian Epic of Gilgamesh, Parpola, Simo, Neo-Assyrian Text Corpus Project, c 1997, Tablet I through Tablet XII, Index of Names, Sign List, and Glossary-(pp. 119–145), 165 pages.
Rainey, 1970. El Amarna Tablets, 359-379, Anson F. Rainey, (AOAT 8, Alter Orient Altes Testament 8)

Cuneiform signs